Trigo Mountains Wilderness is a  wilderness area in the U.S. state of Arizona and was established in 1990. It is a  stretch of ridgeline of the rugged desert Trigo Mountains and is adjacent to historical mines, the Red Cloud and Hart Mine. These rugged desert mountain ecosystems are home to the Desert Bighorn Sheep.

The wilderness area is one of the many wildernesses located within the Lower Colorado River Valley. The Trigo Mountains Wilderness is the northeastern mountain border of the Imperial National Wildlife Refuge along the Colorado River. It is also just east of the Cibola National Wildlife Refuge. The northeast boundary of the wilderness borders the Yuma Proving Ground.

This ecoregion portion of the Colorado River Valley, of two waterfowl refuges, and mountains is associated with the US Army installation of the Yuma Proving Grounds. A major mountain system lies just eastwards, the Kofa National Wildlife Refuge, (with its adjacent Wilderness Area). It is separated by bajada plains from the Trigo Mountains, and other ranges; local tribes of burros and mustangs occur; also mountain lions and bobcat. Free species movements occur, though some animal control is required for the burros and horses along the major route US 95, (north–south route).

See also
 List of U.S. Wilderness Areas
 List of Arizona Wilderness Areas
 List of Arizona Wilderness Areas (LCRV)

References

External links
 Trigo Mountain Wilderness at wilderness.net
 Trigo Mountains Wilderness Area at Bureau of Land Management
 area map; Trigo Mountains Wilderness at Public Lands

Wilderness areas of Arizona
Wilderness areas within the Lower Colorado River Valley
Protected areas of La Paz County, Arizona
Bureau of Land Management areas in Arizona
1990 establishments in Arizona
Protected areas established in 1990